El Mostafa Higazy is an Egyptian philosopher who served as a political advisor to interim President Adly Mansour. He is also the founder of the Nasaq Foundation, an Egyptian think tank focused on issues of justice.

Biography
Higazy studied engineering at USC, eventually earning a PhD in engineering and Strategic Management from USC. He founded NASAQ Foundation as a socio-political think tank, and subsequently founded ACME Corp as an economic arm of NASAQ.

Higazy received much notice for his role as Mansour's political advisor, proving himself a charismatic spokesman.

References

Egyptian philosophers
21st-century Egyptian politicians
University of California, Los Angeles alumni
Living people
Year of birth missing (living people)